Camille Cabrol (born 25 December 1997) is a French freestyle skier. She competed in the 2018 Winter Olympics and 2022 Winter Olympics.

References

External links 
 
 
 
 

1997 births
Living people
Freestyle skiers at the 2018 Winter Olympics
Freestyle skiers at the 2022 Winter Olympics
French female freestyle skiers
Olympic freestyle skiers of France
Université Savoie-Mont Blanc alumni
Sportspeople from Haute-Savoie